The 1939 Paris–Tours was the 34th edition of the Paris–Tours cycle race and was held on 7 May 1939. The race started in Paris and finished in Tours. The race was won by Frans Bonduel.

General classification

References

1939 in French sport
1939
May 1939 sports events